Rongpi is a surname. Notable people with the surname include:

Jayanta Rongpi (born 1955), Indian politician
Mansing Rongpi, Indian politician

Surnames of Indian origin